Conditional clauses in Latin are clauses which start with the conjunction  'if' or the equivalent. The 'if'-clause in a conditional sentence is known as the protasis, and the consequence is called the apodosis.

Conditional clauses are generally divided into three types: open conditions, when the truth of the condition is unknown ('if it is true that...'); ideal conditions, in which the speaker imagines a situation or event which might occur in the future ('if this were to happen...'); and unreal conditions, referring to an event or situation in the present or past known to be contrary to fact ('if it were true that...'). These three are also sometimes referred to as Type 1, Type 2, and Type 3 respectively. Open conditional clauses in turn can be divided into particular and general.

Open conditional sentences generally use the indicative mood in both protasis and apodosis, although in some general conditions the subjunctive mood is used in the protasis. Ideal and unreal conditionals use the subjunctive in the protasis, and usually they also use the subjunctive in the apodosis, though sometimes the indicative may be used. Conditional clauses of comparison ('as if') also use the subjunctive mood in the protasis.

Conditional clauses sometimes overlap in meaning with other types of clause, such as concessive ('although'), causal ('in view of the fact that'), or temporal ('whenever').

The conjunction  is only rarely used in classical Latin to introduce indirect questions, although this usage is found in medieval Latin and is common in Greek and in modern Romance languages such as French and Italian. The use of 'if' to make a wish, found in ancient Greek, is not usual in Latin, except sometimes in poetry.

Main types of conditional clause
A summary of the main types of conditional clause is given in the table below. The subjunctive is used in the protasis of ideal and unreal conditions, and also in some types of general conditions. In the apodosis of ideal and unreal conditions, the verb is usually subjunctive, but sometimes the indicative is used.

A difference from English grammar is that in open future conditions, it is usual in Latin to use one of the future tenses, when English has the present tense.

Apart from the types mentioned below it is also possible to have mixed conditionals, for example with different tenses in protasis and apodosis.

Conditional conjunctions

Positive conjunctions

The conjunction  'but if', 'if on the other hand' is used for the second of two opposite conditions:
 (Cicero)
'so this is how it is, if you are at Rome; but if you are away or even if you are there, the business is as I say'

The pair  (or Livy's preferred form ) 'whether ... or' often does not introduce a full conditional clause and an appropriate verb has to be supplied by the reader:
 (Caesar)
'whether (it happened) by chance or by some plan of the immortal gods'

Sometimes, however, a verb is added:
 (Livy)
'those wars of yours, whether they are imaginary or real'

Sometimes the two words can introduce two alternative apodoses, in the same way as :
 (Ovid)
'if you are a god, you may be Cupid; or if you are mortal, blessed are those who bore you'

The combination  'but if' or 'if, however' can also introduce an alternative:
 (Celsus)
'if, however, the tumor is a large one, it is better for it to be completely cut out'

The combination  means 'although', and it is often followed in the apodosis by  'nonetheless':
 (Nepos)
'although Datames was a long way away from that region, yet he thought it best to humour the king's wish'

 (Petronius)
'and I am just no less free than you, even though my father left me poor'

The conjunction  or  means 'if indeed' or 'if it's true that':

 (Plautus)
'and the cause is a good one, if indeed it is as you claim'

 (Plautus)
'if you want to talk to me, follow me'

 (Plautus)
'if you're looking for me, here I am, present in your presence'

It also can have a causal meaning, 'in view of the fact that':
 (Cicero)
'Roman history is obscure, in view of the fact that we know that king's mother, but have no idea who his father was'

Another combination,  'if indeed', expresses doubt that the situation mentioned is in fact true:
 (Cicero)
'what has caused him to keep away from me, if indeed he has done so, I have no idea'

In other sentences it has the meaning similar to  'provided that':

 (Caesar)
‘(he said) there was no difficulty, whether they stayed or marched, provided that they all shared and approved one plan’

 (Cicero)
‘Varro ... will be fitted in somewhere provided there is room’

Indefinite conditional clauses often use the combinations  'if anyone',  'if anything',  'if any',  'if anyone at all',  'if anything at all',  'if at any time', 'if ever',  'if in any way':

 (Terence)
'if anyone gives anything back, one should be very grateful'

 (Virgil)
'or, if there is any way, if your divine mother has shown you any, take me with you across the waves'

 (Pliny)
'if ever I am reciting, she sits nearby separated by a curtain'

However, it is also possible to use alternative words such as  'if someone',  'if ever', and  'if any', which tend to be more emphatic:

 (Cicero)
'whom, if in any way it's possible, I'd love to see'

 (Cicero)
'I'll be damned if ever I take so much trouble over anything again!'

 (Cicero)
'about which, it won't do any harm if you say something to Balbus'

Negative conditions
When the conditional clause is negative, there are various possibilities:  'if not', 'unless',  'if not',  'were it not that' and  'otherwise'.

means 'unless' or 'if not' or 'except':
 (Livy)
'unless my eyes are deceiving me,' he said, 'your mother and wife and children are here'

 (Cicero)
'don't think that I write longer letters to anyone, except if someone has written more to me'

 (Cicero)
'unless indeed if there is anyone who doesn't think that people like Catiline have the same views as Catiline'

The above kind of -clause, called 'exceptive ', leaves open the possibility that the condition is not met; each of the above examples could be translated 'unless perhaps' or 'unless by chance'.

 (Cicero)
'he did not think he could prove himself to his peers as an enemy of his fatherland unless he were unfriendly to me'

 (Cicero)
'I would be grateful, if it's no bother to you, if you would let me know'

 (Cicero)
'if you can't get there before that date, perhaps I'll see you in Rome'

The combination  is preferred when a particular word is made negative:
 (Cicero)
'if you do it, I will be most grateful; but if you don't, I will forgive you'

The conjunction  is less commonly used, except in Livy and the poets. It is not used by Caesar, and only occasionally in Cicero. In the classical writers it is most often used in unreal conditions:

 (Livy)
'and it would all have been over for the army, if Caeso Fabius had not come just in time to help'

 (Livy)
'the bridge on wooden piles almost gave an entrance to the enemy, had it not been for one man, Horatius Cocles'

Less often  is used in open conditions:

 (Plautus)
'you'll get a flogging, if you don't go away from here'

Another way of expressing the negative, is with :
 (Cicero)
'I have sent you Caesar's letter, in case you had not read it'

 (Cicero)
'take out with you all your friends; failing that, as many as possible'

Open conditions

Present or past
A present open conditional normally has the indicative in both halves. Various tenses are possible, but the present or perfect are common:
 (Cicero)
'if you are in better health now, I am very glad'

 (Terence)
'if I did wrong, I did so unwittingly'

 (Catullus)
'even if you have forgotten, yet the gods remember; Faithfulness remembers'

The following combines an imperfect tense in the protasis and future in the apodosis:
 (Cicero)
'if he was not able to find any way out, who will find one now?'

A conditional clause is often found after  'what is surprising?'
 (Cicero)
'why is it surprising, therefore, if old men are sometimes ill?'

Usually the verb of the apodosis is also indicative, but other moods are possible, such as the imperative below:
 (Caesar)
'"jump down, soldiers," he said, "unless you wish to betray the eagle to the enemies"'

Future
In a future conditional, the protasis usually has one of the future tenses, where English has the simple present. In the following, the simple future tense is used:

 (Cicero)
'if there is (lit. will be) a war, I have decided to be with Pompey'

 (Cicero)
'I shall try and explain more clearly, if I can (lit. if I will be able)'

Often, however, a future conditional uses the future perfect indicative, to refer to an event that must take place first before the consequence happens:

 (Catullus)
'if you bring (lit. will have brought) these things, you will dine well'

 (Cicero)
'if I hear (lit. will have heard) anything sooner, I will write to you'

 (Cicero)
'if I can (lit. will have been able) in any way, even if it means travelling at night, I will try to see you'

 (Livy)
'there is a sword in my hand; you will die, if you utter (lit. will have uttered) a word!'

Sometimes both halves of the conditional can have the future perfect tense, though this is rare:

 (Plautus)
‘if I do tell a lie, I will have done it as I usually do, according to my custom’

If the apodosis of a future conditional is a command, the future imperative (ending in ) is used, rather than the present imperative:

 (Cicero)
'even if you have nothing to write about, write all the same'

The use of the present subjunctive  'if perhaps I can' in the following example adds uncertainty:
 (Livy)
'"I want to cross the Tiber," he said, "senators, and enter the enemies' camp, if perhaps I can"'

Although the future tense is usual in a protasis referring to the future, sometimes, as in English, in colloquial Latin a present tense is used:
 (Terence)
'if I abandon him, I fear for his life'

General or iterative conditions

With the indicative
With general or iterative conditions, in writers of the classical period, it was usual to use the indicative mood, as in the following examples:
 (Celsus)
'if ever in children a second tooth appears before the earlier one has fallen out, the one which ought to have fallen out must be uprooted'

Sometimes, just as with iterative temporal clauses, a perfect indicative in the protasis is followed by a present indicative in the main clause:
 (Cicero)
'if ever a foot or a tooth has begun to ache, we can't bear it'

In a past context, this becomes  with the pluperfect indicative:
 (Caesar)
'if ever our men by throwing in iron hooks had tied up a ship, the enemy would come running from all sides to help their struggling comrades'

 (Sallust)
'if ever they had been unable to deter the enemy from pursuing, they would surround them when they were scattered'

 (Tacitus)
'if the tribunes or legion approved of (a centurion's) industry and innocence, he would retain his rank'

With the subjunctive
In later writers (but still only rarely in Cicero or Caesar) a protasis with iterative meaning could sometimes use the subjunctive mood:
 (Catullus)
'he used to say "chommoda" if ever he wanted to say "commoda"'

 (Caesar)
'if ever any of these slaves was seized by his master, he would be rescued by a concerted effort of the soldiers'

2nd person singular generalisation
When a generalisation uses the 2nd person singular in a condition, meaning 'one' or 'anyone', the verb is usually in the subjunctive mood even in classical writers:
 (Cicero)
'memory gets weaker, if you don't exercise it'

 (Plautus)
'you need to stand on the bed if you want to get something from on top'

The following similarly uses the perfect subjunctive with the 2nd person:
 (Cicero)
'it is no excuse for doing wrong if you have done wrong for the sake of a friend'

The subjunctive is also used in the apodosis of a generalisation if it has a 2nd person singular verb:
 (Plautus)
'if there isn't one, you don't want there to be one and you don't miss it'

Ideal conditions

Ideal conditions (future)
Ideal conditions (also known as 'less vivid future conditions' or 'Type II conditions') are those in which the speaker supposes a situation or an event which might occur in future, at least in the imagination. There is generally an assumption on the speaker's part that the event is not going to take place.

Subjunctive in the apodosis
The tense of an ideal condition is usually present subjunctive, while the main clause usually has the present subjunctive also:
 (Cicero)
'supposing your neighbour had a better horse than yours, would you prefer your horse or his?'

 (Cicero)
'if your country were to speak with you like this, wouldn't it be right for her to get her wish?'

 (Cicero)
'if some god were to grant me that from this age I should become a child again and cry in the cradle, I would strongly refuse!'

 (Cicero)
'if I were to deny that this way is rough and hard, judges, I would be lying.'

The following uses the perfect subjunctive in the protasis:
 (Cicero)
'if I were to be deserted by my circle of listeners, I wouldn't be able to speak'

In the following example, the perfect subjunctive in the main clause is used to describe a future potential result:
 (Plautus)
'if I were to hang myself now, I would simply have given my enemies pleasure'

The following has the perfect subjunctive in both clauses:
 (Juvenal)
'these days (supposing he were to come back to life) no one would give Cicero even two hundred pennies, unless first a huge ring glittered (on Cicero's finger)'

Indicative in the apodosis
Sometimes, however, the indicative is used in the main clause, as in the following:
 (Seneca)
'if anyone were to give advice to a madman, he would be (lit. will be) crazier than the one he is advising'

 (Livy)
'supposing the enemy come to the city, what are you going to do?'

It is frequently used by Cicero as well as other writers:
 (Nepos)
'it would be tedious to recount all the battles'

Past ideal conditionals
An ideal condition can occur in a past context also, in which case it uses the imperfect subjunctive. In the following, the apodosis has the imperfect subjunctive:
 (Horace)
'even supposing Caesar himself were to have asked him (to sing), it wouldn't have done any good.'

 (Cicero)
'but if I had tried to speak then, I would not have been heard.'

 (Livy)
'fearing that if he were to go without the permission of the consuls, he might be caught and dragged back by the Roman guards, he approached the senate'

In the following, the verb in the apodosis is imperfect indicative:
 (Caesar)
'nor was there any way he was able to prevent Caesar's fortifications, unless he wished to fight it out with a battle'

 (Livy)
'if they went openly in daylight, the enemy was likely to get there first.'

Although conditionals of this kind use  with the imperfect subjunctive in the same way as an unreal conditional, the meaning is different. In an unreal conditional, the imperfect subjunctive refers to a situation contrary to fact at the present time or at the time of the story, while in a past ideal conditional, the imperfect subjunctive refers prospectively to a situation that might have occurred at a later time than the time of the narrative.

Unreal conditions

Present unreal
In an unreal or counterfactual conditional sentence the imperfect subjunctive describes a situation contrary to fact in the present and what would follow if that situation were true. The apodosis also usually has the same tense:
 (Cicero)
'if I could sleep, I wouldn't be bothering you with such long letters'

 (Cicero)
'I would write more to you about this if you were in Rome'

 (Cicero)
'if I were able to achieve this (i.e. the banishment of Catiline's friends) with a word, I would be banishing those men themselves who are saying this'

Woodcock notes that in early Latin such as Plautus, the present subjunctive rather than the imperfect is often used to represent a present-time counterfactual condition:
 (Plautus)
'I would not be asking you, if I knew.'

 (Terence)
'if you were in my place, you would think differently'

In early Latin there is thus a blurring of the distinction between the ideal and the unreal conditional.

Past unreal
The same tense is usually used both in the protasis and the apodosis:

 (Cicero)
'if I had been in Rome, I would have seen you and thanked you in person'

 (Quintilian)
‘if he had killed him, he would have done so rightly; but he did not kill him’

 (Virgil)
'you flee, if you wish: but as for me, if the gods had wanted me to prolong my life, they would have saved this home for me'

 (Tacitus)
'by everyone's consent, (Galba would have been seen as) capable of being Emperor, had he never ruled'

 (Livy)
'and the army would have been annihilated if the woods hadn't provided cover for those who were fleeing'

 (Livy)
'and the city would have been besieged, if the consul Horatius had not been recalled.'

In other authors, however, the same meaning is expressed using a perfect participle + :

 ([Caesar])
'but if night hadn't interrupted the battle, Caesar would have gained control of the whole enemy fleet'

Sometimes a pluperfect subjunctive is followed by an imperfect or vice versa:
 (Livy)
'therefore if I had not given birth, Rome would not now be being attacked; if I did not have a son, I would have died a free woman in a free country'

 (Virgil)
'if Troy could be defended by anyone's right hand, it would have been defended before now even by this one'

Sometimes an imperfect subjunctive refers to the past rather than the present, and represents a hypothetical situation prevailing at the time of the event described in the apodosis:
 (Cicero)
'for the great wealth of Carthage would not have collapsed so easily, if that refuge had not been available to our fleets at the time'

 (Cicero)
'if this man had been in his right mind, would he have dared to lead out an army?'

Sometimes in poetry, an unreal conditional uses the present or perfect subjunctive as if it were an ideal conditional:
 (Virgil)
'had my care not stood in the way, flames would already have carried them off.'

 (Virgil)
'and if his learned companion had not warned him, he would have rushed in and vainly beaten away the shadows with his sword'

An imperfect subjunctive can sometimes be used in poetry with a similar meaning:

 (Virgil)
'indeed they would have continued examining everything carefully with their eyes, had it not been that Achates, who had been sent ahead, was now present'

Indicative in the apodosis
Although most unreal conditionals have the subjunctive in the apodosis, it is also possible, just as with ideal conditions, sometimes to use the indicative, especially if the verb is one of possibility or obligation:

 (Livy)
'and they could not have been withstood, if the reserved cohorts had not thrown themselves in the way'

 (Tacitus)
'if their success hadn't turned into laziness, they might well have thrown off the yoke'

 (Juvenal)
'(Cicero) would have been able to despise Antony's swords, if he had said everything as badly as this'

 (Livy)
'if you had delayed for a single day, you must certainly have all died.'

 (Cicero)
'but if he had thought like this, it would certainly have been preferable for Milo to offer his throat to Publius Clodius'

The imperfect indicative is used for actions that were interrupted. The protasis is usually negative:

 (Cicero)
'I was about to fall further into error, if I had not held myself back'

 (Tacitus)
'he was rushing into the embrace of his daughter who was running towards him, (and they would have hugged) if the bodyguards had not intervened and stood in the way of them both'

 (Tacitus)
'Caecina had fallen and was about to be surrounded, if the first legion hadn't put themselves in the way'

The perfect indicative with  'almost' indicates an event that nearly took place:
 (Livy)
'the wooden bridge almost gave the enemy a means of entry, had it not been for one man, Horatius Cocles.'

The pluperfect indicative is sometimes used for events that looked almost certain to happen:
 (Livy)
'if the Latins had not taken up arms, we would certainly have been captured and wiped out.'

 (Florus)
'the war would have been over immediately, if he had managed to crush Pompey in Brundisium.'

In later, post-classical Latin, it became regular for the indicative to be used in the apodosis of an unreal conditional, as in this example from Gregory of Tours (6th century A.D.):

 (Gregory of Tours)
'if it had been allowable, I would have called an angel from heaven'

Conditional clauses of comparison
Expressions such as  'as if',  'equally as if',  'in the same way as if',  'as though' introduce conditional clauses of comparison. As with ideal and unreal conditions, the verb in the conditional clause is usually in the subjunctive mood. However, the tenses differ from ordinary ideal and unreal conditionals. The main verb is usually either indicative or imperative, and the subordinate clause follows the tense of this according to the sequence of tenses rule. Thus the present subjunctive is usual if the main verb is in the present tense:

 (Plautus)
'I must walk as if I were lame'

 (Quintilian)
'don't be nervous as if you were giving a penny to an elephant'

 (Livy)
'here we must make a stand, soldiers, just as if we were fighting before the walls of Rome'

The perfect subjunctive can be used to refer to an imaginary past situation in a primary-context sentence:

 (Livy)
'I am as delighted to have reached the end of the Punic War as I would be if I had been part of the struggle and danger myself'

The following example is exceptional in that the imperfect subjunctive is used in the 'as if' clause, even though the main verb is primary:

 (Cicero)
'I should like you to watch over Egnatius's interests while he is away just as if they were my business'

When the main verb is perfect or pluperfect, the verb in the conditional clause is imperfect subjunctive, if it imagines a situation coinciding in time with the main verb:

 (Livy)
'fear overcame the senators as great as if the enemy were already at the gates'

The pluperfect subjunctive is used for an imagined event preceding the time of main verb in a historic context:

 (Livy)
'as if he had tripped and fallen, he touched the earth with a kiss'

 (Livy)
'the race of Ausonians was wiped out just as surely as if they had fought in a war to the death'

'If by chance' or 'in case'
A common idiom in Latin is for a conditional clause, especially one starting  'if by chance', to mean 'to see if by chance' or 'on the off chance that'. This is common in contexts such as 'go to see if', 'try to see if' and 'wait to see if':

In the following example, the present indicative is used:
 (Plautus)
'I'll go and visit him here, if by chance he's at home'

However, in most such sentences, since there is some idea of purpose, the subjunctive mood is used. The following uses the present subjunctive, since it follows a present tense verb:
 (Plautus)
'he immediately orders that same servant to make enquiries, (to see) if in any way he may be able to find the woman who picked up (the baby)'

The following use the imperfect subjunctive, since the context is historic:
 (Caesar)
'the enemy were waiting (to see) if our men would cross this (marsh)'

 (Livy)
'he headed for the nearest cave (to see) if perhaps footprints led there'

 (Cicero)
'he did not refuse even with his last breath to try (to see) if he could bring some help to the republic'

The word  in conditionals of this kind can also be translated 'in case':
 (Livy)
'he kept the soldiers in arms, in case there might later be need for help'

In the following epistolary tenses are used, so that the subjunctive is pluperfect rather than perfect:
 (Cicero)
'I have sent you Caesar's letter, in case you haven't read it'

Wishes
However, occasionally in poetry a wish may be expressed with  followed by a subjunctive mood verb. The construction is described by Gildersleeve & Lodge as 'poetical and very rare':
 (Virgil)
'o, if only Jupiter would bring back for me the years which have passed!'

 (Virgil)
'o, if only something of our former courage were here!'

Conditionals in indirect speech

Indirect present and future conditions
Subordinate clauses in indirect speech usually use the subjunctive mood. However, if the introductory verb is 1st or 2nd person, the indicative is sometimes retained in a conditional clause, as in the following example:
 (Cicero)
'I hope that if (Catiline) is acquitted, he will work more closely with me in my election campaign'

Otherwise the verb in the protasis becomes subjunctive, as in the following:
 (Caesar)
'he advises him that, if he can't approach, he should throw a javelin inside the walls of the camp with the letter attached to the strap'

 (Caesar)
'(he said that) if they wished for peace, it was unfair to refuse to pay tribute'

The verbs in the above sentences are present subjunctive, despite the historic context, by a process called , which makes the situation more vivid.

If the verb in an apodosis is a future perfect tense in direct speech, it cannot be expressed using an active verb, but it is possible to use or deponent or passive perfect participle with :
 (Cicero)
'I can say this, that I will have achieved enough, if no danger redounds on me'

When the context is past, a future perfect tense in the protasis usually becomes a pluperfect subjunctive:
 (Cicero)
'(the voice said) that, unless some precaution was taken, Rome would be captured'

 (Cicero)
'he warned Crassus what was likely to happen, if he wasn't careful'

 (Livy)
'(Regulus) vowed a temple to Jupiter the Stayer, if the Roman battle-line stopped fleeing'

 (Livy)
'Gracchus proclaimed that they had no hope at all of liberty unless the enemy were routed and put to flight on that day'

 (Caesar)
'they said that if these things were reported to Ariovistus, they did not doubt that he would punish them all'

In the following sentence, instead of a pluperfect subjunctive, the imperfect subjunctive  is used with a prospective or future meaning:
 (Cicero)
'and I didn't doubt that, if the republican government were restored, it would bring me back with it'

 (Livy)
'(he said that) he would use their help if ever one day there was a war with the people of Veii'

 (Cicero)
'(he was confident) that even if (the pain) were going to be very great, it would be brief'

Combined with a perfect or deponent participle,  can stand in a protasis for a future perfect tense of direct speech:

 (Sallust)
'he was seeking the consulship, hoping that if he should be elected he would easily manage Antony according to his pleasure'

 (Livy)
'the senators then became afraid that, if the army was dismissed, once again secret gatherings and conspiracies might take place'

 (Sallust)
'they believed that the consulate would be almost polluted, if a new man, however, talented, were to have obtained it'

Indirect ideal conditions
Since in indirect speech the subjunctive is usually used in a subordinate clause, the distinction between the ideal conditional and the simple future conditional disappears. In the following examples, only the context indicates that the conditional is ideal:
 (Cicero)
'he says that if he were to be being burnt, he would say "how pleasant this is!"'

The perfect subjunctive can also be used if the context is present:
 (Cicero)
'we ourselves have never seen such a (perfectly wise) man; but it is explained in the opinions of philosophers what such a person would be like, if one were ever to exist'

As mentioned above, the perfect participle with  represents a future perfect passive in the main clause:
 (Cicero)
'(the philosophers say that) if someone removed fear, all carefulness of living would have been removed too'

Indirect unreal conditions (present)
If a conditional clause in indirect speech describes a present situation contrary to fact, the verb in the apodosis is the periphrastic perfect infinitive, consisting of a future participle +  (e.g. ). The imperfect subjunctive in the protasis remains unchanged, even after a primary tense verb:

 (Cicero)
'what do you think? do you not think that if reason existed in wild beasts, each kind would not attribute most to its own kind?'

 (Cicero)
'they confess that they would not even lift a hand for the sake of virtue, unless virtue itself gave pleasure'

 (Cicero)
'do you think any old woman would be so crazy as to believe in dreams if those dreams didn't come true by chance sometimes?'

 (Pliny)
'what do we think would be happening to him if he were alive?' – 'he would be dining with us!'

In the following, a present unreal situation follows from an unreal past condition:
 (Livy)
'be aware that your allies used to pay tribute to the Gauls, and they would still be paying now, if my efforts had been slackened'

If the apodosis is an indirect question, the future participle is combined with the perfect subjunctive  instead of the perfect infinitive :
 (Seneca)
'think how much extra speed you would put on, if an enemy were pursuing you from behind!'

Indirect unreal conditions (past)
In an indirect past unreal conditional, the apodosis is also often expressed using the future participle plus , exactly as a present unreal conditional:
 (Quintilian)
'it is unlikely that he would have told a lie unless he had been desperate'

 (Livy)
'but take this message to him, that I would have died better if I had not married on the day of my funeral!'

 (Livy)
'for he said that he would have agreed to accept the names of two patricians, if he could see anyone other than himself becoming consul'

When the indirect speech is an indirect question, or a  clause, rather than an indirect statement, the construction in the apodosis is the same, except that the perfect infinitive  is replaced by the perfect subjunctive :
 (Livy)
'tell us, Appius Claudius, what you would have done if you had been censor at that time?'

When the verb is passive,  can occasionally be used. However, this is very rare, and only two instances have been noted:
 (Caesar)
'if at that very moment certain reports had not arrived bringing news of Caesar's victory, most people reckoned that the town would have been lost'

Another way of expressing a passive verb in the apodosis of an unreal conditional in indirect speech is to use the perfect infinitive of  combined with a present passive infinitive; that is, to write 'could have been done' instead of 'would have been done', since the two are close in meaning:
 (Caesar)
'but most people think that if he had been prepared to follow up the pursuit more vigorously, the war could have been finished on that day'

Similarly in an indirect question, the perfect subjunctive  with the present infinitive can be used:
 (Cicero)
'you ask what more Plancius could/would have achieved, if he had been the son of Gnaeus Scipio'

Another possibility, when the main verb in a -clause is passive, is for the tense to be unchanged from direct speech. Thus in the following, the pluperfect subjunctive is retained:
 (Cicero)
'if he had rejected that, do you doubt that violence would have been done to him?'

Even after a historic introductory verb, the perfect subjunctive is usually still retained in a  clause (contrary to the usual sequence of tenses rule):
 (Livy)
'nor was there any doubt that if it were possible for so few to manage everything at once, the enemy would have turned their backs'

Exactly the same sequence of tenses is used if the conditional sentence is part of a consecutive clause instead of a -clause:
 (Livy)
'that situation caused so much panic that if the Carthaginian camp hadn't been situated outside the city, all the frightened mob would have poured out'

Similarly the perfect subjunctive , not the pluperfect , is also usually used even after an historic-tense introductory verb to express a passive verb:
 (Livy)
'there was no doubt that if the delay had not intervened, the Carthaginian camp could/would have been captured that day'

Occasionally, however, after a historic verb the pluperfect subjunctive  is used, but this is rare, and found only in Livy:
 (Livy)
'it occurred to them how impossible Etruria would have been, if anything had gone wrong in Samnium'

The following example is unusual in that it envisages a future event that might one day have taken place if a past situation had been different. The tense used in the apodosis is the imperfect subjunctive:
 (Cicero)
'if at that time Publius Sestius had died, I do not doubt that one day a statue would be set up to this man in the forum'

Indirect questions with 
Instead, after the verb  'I ask', the simple suffix  is usually used:
 (Cicero)
'I asked if he recognised the seal; he nodded'

However, Livy sometimes uses :
 (Livy)
'it is reported that he said nothing else except to ask if Lycortas and the cavalrymen had escaped unharmed'

According to Lewis and Short's dictionary, this usage derives from the meaning 'to see if by chance' described above. A sentence where this meaning after  is more evident is the following:
 (Martial)
'I have been searching for a long time through the whole city (to see) if any girl will say no; not one says no'

Another place where 'if' is used in modern languages is in expressions such as 'I don't know if ...'. However, in classical Latin after  or  'I do not know', it is usual to use the particle :

 (Seneca)
'I have no way of knowing if I am going to be of benefit to the person I am advising'

 (Virgil)
'but I am being tossed by the Fates, uncertain whether Jupiter wishes there to be one city for the Tyrians and the refugees from Troy'

Conditional clause equivalents
Occasionally conditional clauses can be made without a conjunction. An imperative is sometimes used:

 (Ovid)
'keep busy (and) you will be safe'

 (Cato)
'hold the subject matter, the words will follow'

Sometimes  'and' is added, or (from the time of Virgil onwards) :

 (Plautus)
'go ahead, and you will easily carry it through'

 (Virgil)
‘tell me and to me you will be great Apollo’

Sometimes the word  'if' or  'even if' is simply omitted, usually with a subjunctive verb:

 (Cicero)
'(if) someone has a daughter, he needs money'

 (Pliny the Younger)
‘had you given this man a body equal to his spirit, he would have done what he desired’

 (Horace)
'(even if) you expel nature with a pitchfork, nonetheless it will keep coming back'

Another possibility is a participle phrase:

 (Cicero)
'nothing can occur unless there is some preceding cause'

 (Cicero)
'if this reason were to be removed, the whole basis of the case would also have been removed'

In other sentences a conditional is implied in an adjectival phrase:

 (Lucretius)
'life could not be lived well without a pure heart'

Bibliography
Bertocchi, Alessandra; Maraldi, Mirka (2011). "Conditionals and concessives". In: Baldi, Philip; Cuzzolin, Pierluigi.New perspectives on historical Latin syntax. Volume 4, Complex sentences, grammaticalization, typology, chapter 4. de Gruyter, pp. 93–193.
Gildersleeve, B. L. & Gonzalez Lodge (1895). Gildersleeve's Latin Grammar. 3rd Edition. (Macmillan)
Greenough, J. B. et al. (1903). Allen and Greenough's New Latin Grammar for Schools and Colleges. Boston and London.
Kennedy, Benjamin Hall (1871). The Revised Latin Primer. Edited and further revised by Sir James Mountford, Longman 1930; reprinted 1962.
Salmon, E. T. (1931). "A Note on Subordinate Clauses in Oratio Obliqua". The Classical Review, Vol. 45, No. 5 (Nov., 1931), p. 173.
Terrell, Glanville (1904). "The Apodosis of the Unreal Condition in Oratio Obliqua in Latin". The American Journal of Philology, Vol. 25, No. 1 (1904), pp. 59–73.
Woodcock, E.C. (1959), A New Latin Syntax.

See also
Ancient Greek conditional clauses
Conditional sentence
Counterfactual conditional

References

External links
University of Chicago Perseus under PhiloLogic searchable corpus. Perseus under PhiloLogic home page
Online version of Allen & Greenough's Latin Grammar
Online version of Gildersleeve & Lodge's Latin Grammar

Latin grammar
Natural language conditionals
Clauses